Irion is a surname. Notable people with the surname include:

Alfred Briggs Irion (1833–1903), U.S. Representative from Louisiana
Johnny Irion (born 1969) and Sarah Lee Guthrie (born 1979), United States musical duo
Robert Anderson Irion (1804–1861), physician, surveyor and Secretary of State of Texas

See also
Irion County, Texas, county located in the U.S. state of Texas

Surnames from given names